Richard Metcalfe Fisher known as Dick Fisher (1933-1986) was an international speedway rider from England.

Speedway career 
Fisher reached the final of the Speedway World Championship in the 1963 Individual Speedway World Championship and 1964 Individual Speedway World Championship.

He rode in the top tier of British Speedway from 1953 to 1966, riding for Belle Vue Aces.

Fisher was capped by England once  and Great Britain four times. He was the Belle Vue captain for three seasons and rode for them for 14 consecutive seasons in 264 National League matches and scored 1797 points.

World final appearances

Individual World Championship
 1963 –  London, Wembley Stadium – 13th – 5pts
 1964 –  Gothenburg, Ullevi – 16th – 1pt

World Team Cup
 1963 -  Vienna, Stadion Wien (with Barry Briggs / Peter Craven / Peter Moore) - 3rd - 25pts (4)

References 

1933 births
1986 deaths
British speedway riders
Belle Vue Aces riders